Göran "Flygis" Sjöberg (born June 8, 1960) is a retired Swedish ice hockey player and coach. From 2005 to 2007, he was assistant coach in the Swedish Elitserien club HV71.

Playing career 
Sjöberg has played for Brynäs IF (two seasons) and VIK Västerås HK (five seasons) in Sweden's top elite ice hockey league Elitserien. He retired from his active playing career after the season 1991–92 in which he played for Team Gävle in Swedish division 1, tier three in the Swedish league structure.

Coaching career 
He coached the Storhamar Dragons of Hamar, Norway from 1994 to 1995, where he led the team to its first Norwegian championship.

From 2005 to 2007, Sjöberg was assistant coach to Pär Mårts in HV71. Before coming to HV71 Sjöberg has coached Brynäs IF and AIK (together with Mårts). Before that he coached Brynäs IF's youth club Hille/Åbyggeby in division 1.

References 

1960 births
Brynäs IF players
Living people
Storhamar Dragons coaches
Swedish ice hockey forwards
Swedish ice hockey coaches
VIK Västerås HK players